Giovanni Schiavo (8 July 1903 – 27 January 1967) was an Italian Roman Catholic priest and a professed member from the Congregation of Saint Joseph – otherwise known as the Murialdines. Schiavo entered the Murialdines during World War I in 1917 where Eugenio Reffo allowed him to join and he was later ordained to the priesthood in Vicenza in 1927 a decade later. His superiors allowed him to join the missions – to spread the charism of the Murialdines – in Brazil where he served from 1931 until his death several decades after.

The beatification process for the late priest commenced under Pope John Paul II in Brazil on 28 April 2001 after he became titled as a Servant of God and the confirmation of his life of heroic virtue allowed for Pope Francis to declare him as Venerable on 14 December 2015. Francis approved a miracle to him on 1 December 2016. This allowed for Schiavo to be beatified with the celebration held in Caxias do Sul with Cardinal Angelo Amato presiding on 28 October 2017.

Life
Giovanni Schiavo was born in Montecchio Maggiore – in Vicenza – as the first of nine children to the poor but pious Luigi Schiavo and Rosa Fittorelli. At one stage he suffered from meningitis for four years that almost killed him.

Aged eighteen he received an offer to work in the local council but turned this offer down since he knew his path was for the religious life. He sought the aid of the parish priest Giuseppe Dalla Pria who encouraged him and aided him on his path to realizing his religious vocation. Schiavo's strong call towards the religious life led him to decide to become a priest and to that effect commenced his studies that would lead him down that path – those that oversaw his education was the Congregation of Saint Joseph who had such an impact on the seminarian (he fostered an intense devotion to Saint Joseph) that he requested to be admitted into the order to which Eugenio Reffo welcomed him in 1917; he underwent his novitiate in Volvera. Schiavo made his first profession on 28 August 1919 and then made his final vows in 1925; he commenced his philosophical and theological studies for the priesthood in 1919. He dreamed of being sent to the missions in Ecuador and was firm in his decision to die there for his faith if anti-religious forces persecuted him for his duties to the people.

He was ordained to the priesthood on 10 July 1927 in Vicenza and served until 1931 as a pastor in Italian cities such as Modena and Oderzo. In 1931 his superiors allowed him to go to Brazil to become part of the missions there as a means of spreading the charism of their order and cementing the order's presence in that nation – Schiavo would never return to his native land. On 26 July 1930 he penned in his journal of the need to remain true to the Gospel and the teachings of Jesus Christ as he prepared for a new assignment since he knew he would soon go to Brazil after being put on the waiting list. His superiors made the decision to send him to Brazil on 4 June 1931 and he recorded in his journal: "I was chosen for the missions of Brazil ... Deo Gratias!" He underwent a spiritual retreat to Albano in 1931 in order to prepare for this mission and departed on 4 August 1931.

The priest arrived in Jagurão on 5 September 1931 where he began his mission but was reassigned on 25 November 1931 from there to Ana Rech. He then served as a school director at Galópolis from 1935 to 1936 when it closed in 1937 and thus prompted him to return to Ana Rech. It was in Brazil that he served as the provincial superior for his order from 1947 until his resignation in February 1956; he also served as the master of novices and as a teacher for a brief period. Schiavo was also tasked with supervising the formation and ongoing spiritual cultivation of a Brazilian group of nuns of the Murialdines and was soon a formidable pastor that priests and religious communities alike requested aid them for his spiritual guidance. In 1957 he founded the School Sisters of Saint Maria Goretti where he acted as its director in addition to assuming the duties of a teacher.

Padre Schiavo was hospitalized for a serious illness on 20 November 1966 for he had serious liver complications that hepatitis he had exacerbated while he was diagnosed on 15 December 1966 with having liver cancer after having a biopsy; an operation was deemed impossible because cardiac arrest during the procedure was a strong risk and anesthesia was scarce. He died of that illness at 9:30am on 27 January 1967. In the hours before his death he continued to repeat: "My Jesus – mercy!" and his final words were: "Father, I am Your son; I always wanted to do Your will". He died with the Bishop of Caxias do Sul Benedito Zorzi and his auxiliary bishop Cândido Julio Bampi present. Bishop Zorzi led his funeral at the cathedral and his remains were interred on 28 January 1967 in a simple grave; on 16 March 2015 a chapel was built on and around his grave.

Beatification
The beatification process commenced under Pope John Paul II on 28 April 2001 after he became titled as a Servant of God when the Congregation for the Causes of Saints issued the official "nihil obstat" – or 'nothing against' to the cause – and allowed it to commence on a diocesan level in Caxias do Sul. Bishop Nei Paulo Moretto oversaw the inauguration of the diocesan process on 9 September 2001 and also oversaw its closure on 18 October 2003. The C.C.S. issued the validation to the process on 20 November 2004 and it allowed for the postulation to submit the official Positio dossier to the C.C.S. in 2012.

Theologians – all nine of them – voted in favor of the merits of the cause in their meeting of 5 March 2015 while the cardinal and bishop members of the C.C.S. followed this verdict as well in their meeting of 27 October 2015. Schiavo was named as Venerable on 14 December 2015 after Pope Francis confirmed that the late priest had indeed lived a model Christian life of heroic virtue – both cardinal and theological.

The miracle required for his beatification was investigated in Brazil in a diocesan process that spanned from 19 March 2009 until 12 September 2009 when the process concluded and all documentation was shipped in boxes to Rome to the C.C.S. on 24 September 2009. The process was made valid on 4 June 2010. The medical board voiced their approval to the miracle on 18 February 2016 while theologians also voted likewise on 21 June 2016. The C.C.S. met to discuss the miracle on 18 October 2016. Pope Francis approved this on 1 December 2016 and this allowed for his beatification to take place.

It was reported that the beatification would have taken place in January 2017 if the miracle received papal approval sometime in either November or December 2016 though was debunked when the official date was scheduled for some months later. The beatification was celebrated in Caxias do Sul on 28 October 2017 and Cardinal Angelo Amato presided over the celebration on the pope's behalf.

The current postulator assigned to the cause is Orides Ballardin.

Miracle
The miracle in question for his beatification involves the cure of Juvelino Cara who was rushed to hospital on 9 September 1997 with severe abdominal pains he suffered and was later diagnosed with incurable acute peritonitis. Cara's wife invoked the intercession of the late Schiavo and Cara recuperated at a rapid pace over the next week.

References

External links
Hagiography Circle
Santi e Beati
Murialdines

1903 births
1967 deaths
20th-century venerated Christians
20th-century Italian Roman Catholic priests
Heads of schools in Brazil
Beatifications by Pope Francis
Brazilian beatified people
Deaths from liver cancer
Italian beatified people
Italian educators
Italian expatriates in Brazil
Italian Roman Catholic missionaries
Missionary educators
People from Vicenza
Roman Catholic missionaries in Brazil
Roman Catholic religious educators
Venerated Catholics by Pope Francis